Parak (also known as Parakī) is a village in Dasht-e Barm Rural District, Kuhmareh District, Kazerun County, Fars Province, Iran. At the 2006 census, its population was 109, in 20 families.

References 

Populated places in Kazerun County